Lapparentichnus is an ichnogenus of dinosaur footprint, a theropod trackway, made by a member of the Avetheropoda.

See also

 List of dinosaur ichnogenera

References

Bibliography

Dinosaur trace fossils